Sharon Marston is a British designer known internationally for her bespoke light installations and chandeliers.

Works include lighting installations for Marina Bay Sands Casino, OC Tanner Flagship Store, House of Fraser and chandeliers featured in the 2012 film 'Mirror Mirror'', ‘Designing 007 – Fifty Years of Bond Style’ a Barbican touring exhibition 2012/13, and the V&A’s ‘Brilliant’ exhibition’ 2004, where Marston’s commissioned piece was amongst the first contemporary lighting to be exhibited at the Victoria & Albert Museum.

Biography 

Born in Hereford, Sharon Marston studied jewellery at Middlesex University and went on to design for fashion, theatre and dance for companies such as Bella Freud, Michiko Koshino, Paul Smith and The English National Opera.

Marston established her London-based studio in 1997 and working to an architectural scale, specialises in the design and creation of exclusive light installations and chandeliers using fibre optic technology.

Marston’s designs “fuse materials sampled from a range of industries and craft disciplines crossing boundaries between art, fashion, product design and combining traditional processes and techniques with contemporary design”.

Collections 
 V&A, London

Exhibitions 

 Design Resolutions - Royal Festival Hall, (1998)
 Home Sweet Home – British Council, Lesley Jackson (2001)
 Jaeger Flagship Store window display (2003 & 2004)
 Brilliant, V&A, Jane Pavitt, 2004
 Daks Flagship Store window display (2004)
 Aquascutum Flagship Store window display (2005)
 Collect, V&A (2005)

References

External links 
 Sharon Marston corporate website
 Designers Under Pressure, Channel 4 Learning International
 Judith Mackrell, Yolande Snaith Theatredance, The Guardian
 Katie Fried, Craft, The Guardian
 The Martha Stewart Blog, The Final Blog from Singapore

Living people
1970 births